East Runton Windmill is a grade II listed tower mill at East Runton, Norfolk, England which has been converted to residential accommodation.

History
The first record of this windmill is its appearance on Bryant’s map of Norfolk published in 1826. The mill was owned by Joseph Baker in 1836. He was a miller and brickmaker. The mill was to let in 1843. On 1 November 1860 a fifteen year old girl named Martha Holman was struck by one of the sails and knocked unconscious. The mill was working until at least 1908, when Ronald Hall was the miller, but it was derelict in 1926.

The mill still had a cap in 1937, but the sails and fantail had been removed by then. By 1949, the mill had been stripped of machinery. The tower retained the remains of the cap frame in 1984. In 2003, the mill was converted to residential accommodation, with a new cap and fantail added.

Description

East Runton Windmill is a five storey tower mill with a stage at second floor level. It has a boat shaped cap with a gallery, winded by a fantail. The mill had four double Patent sails and drove three pairs of millstones.

Millers
Joseph Baker 1836-43
George Waterson 1845-46
Joseph Baker 1841-56
Stephen Millet 1858-59
James Kemp 1860-1904
Ronald Hall 1908

Reference for above:-

Gallery

References

External links
Windmill World webpage on East Runton mill

Towers completed in the 1820s
East Runton
Windmills in Norfolk
North Norfolk
Tower mills in the United Kingdom
Grade II listed buildings in Norfolk
Grinding mills in the United Kingdom
Grade II listed windmills